Haw Par Corporation Limited is a Singaporean company involved in healthcare, leisure products, property and investment. It is the company responsible for Tiger Balm branded liniment (ointment). Its brands also included Kwan Loong and it also owns and operates weekend and leisure time destinations such as oceanariums.

The Haw Par Group owns two oceanariums: the now-defunct Underwater World oceanarium attraction at Sentosa, Singapore, and Underwater World Pattaya in Thailand.

History

Predecessors

The predecessor of Haw Par Corporation, Eng Aun Tong, was founded by Aw Chu Kin, father of Aw Boon Haw and Boon Par brothers. Eng Aun Tong was then relocated to Singapore and expanded its branch to many Chinese communities in Asia. Aw Boon Haw also built Haw Par Villas in Hong Kong, Singapore and in Yongding District, Longyan, China. A private company, Haw Par Brothers (Private) Limited was incorporated in 1932 as a holding company for a vast majority of the family assets.

Establishment, IPO and family dispute
Haw Par Brothers International Limited was incorporated on 18 July 1969 by the Aw family (descendant of the late Aw Boon Haw and Boon Par brothers), in order to list most of the assets of Haw Par Brothers (Private) Limited on the Stock Exchange of Malaysia and Singapore. The assets included the brand Eng Aun Tong and Tiger Balm for liniment products, Sin Poh (Star News) Amalgamated that publishes newspaper in Singapore and Malaysia, as well as subsidiaries in Hong Kong, Taiwan and Thailand. The company also owned an equity investment in Chung Khiaw Bank, as well as a lease contract that signed between Haw Par Brothers International and Haw Par Brothers (Private), to use the Tiger Balm Gardens in Hong Kong and Singapore that were owned by the latter. The shares started to trade in the exchange in November 1969.

The listed company made a major disinvestment in 1970, selling Hong Kong Eng Aun Tong building located in Wan Chai Road for HK$2.8 million, in order to raise fund the Hong Kong subsidiary for other investment. Nevertheless, the actual price was disputed, as the buyer told the press in Hong Kong another figure.

However, a year after IPO, Aw family sold the controlling stake of the family to Slater Walker, At the same time Sin Poh (Star News) Amalgamated was privatized by Aw Cheng Chye, eldest son of the late Aw Boon Par. Aw Cheng Chye also bought back some of the shares from Slater Walker. Haw Par Brothers International also sold 49.8% stake of Chung Khiaw Bank to United Overseas Bank for S$22 million. Aw Cheng Chye was also re-elected as the chairman of Haw Par Brothers International despite the takeover. After the sudden death of Aw Cheng Chye during a trip in Santiago de Chile in August 1971, as well as re-election of the board of directors, it was reported that the listed company was chaired by Richard Tarling while Haw Par Brothers (Private) Limited was chaired by Aw It Haw, the fourth and the first biological son of the late Aw Boon Haw.

Aw Kow, the eldest (adopted) son of the late Aw Boon Haw, who resigned as the director of Sin Poh (Star News) Amalgamated and the managing director of Sin Chew Jit Poh in May 1971 due to his personal investment in Eastern Sun, also sued Haw Par Brothers (Private) Limited in 1972 for blocking him to read its accounts and financial statements, claiming under the late Aw Cheng Chye, the company allowed personal spending of Aw Cheng Chye, was invoiced by the company itself. The lawsuit was settled in 1977, in favour Aw Kow.

In the autobiography Escape from Paradise by John & May Chu Harding, they also claimed that Aw Cheng Chye's decision to make Haw Par Brothers International public, was against the wish of the part of the Aw family. May Chu Harding, née Lee, was the great-granddaughter of Aw Boon Par, or granddaughter of Lee Chee Shan and Aw Cheng Hu. Lee Chee Shan was the president of Chung Khiaw Bank in 1971.

Under Aw Cheng Chye as chairman, Haw Par Brothers (Private) also attempted to sell Tiger Balm Garden of Hong Kong in 1961; the last piece of the garden was sold to Cheung Kong in 1998 and the main building of the mansion was donated to the Hong Kong Government.

Expansion under Slater Walker
After Haw Par Brothers International was taken over by Slater Walker in June 1971, the new owner changed Haw Par Brothers International from a family-held business into a true business enterprise. Slater Walker also sold 20% stake of Haw Par Brothers International to Slater Walker's associate company Australian Industrial and Mining Corporation (Austim) in November 1971, as well as a second listing of Haw Par Brothers International on the Hong Kong Stock Exchange and in the London Stock Exchange. Austim sold 55% stake of Motor and General Investment Underwriters Holdings Singapore to Haw Par Brothers International in August 1971. It was announced that the Holdings would purchase a Singapore construction company Scott & English in September 1971.

After the resignation of both Lee Aik Sim (Lee Santipongchai), and his wife Aw Cheng Sin (Suri Santipongchai), the daughter of late Aw Boon Par as the directors of Haw Par Brothers (Thailand) in January 1972, the subsidiary was sold in the same month to Jack Chia. Jack Chia and Haw Par Brothers International also formed a joint venture, which the joint venture have the rights to use "Tiger Balm" brand. In March 1972 Haw Par Brothers International acquired fellow pharmaceutical company in Chinese medicines, Hong Kong listed company Kwan Loong & Co., However, Slater Walker turned the Hong Kong company into an investment vehicle in financial market, which was known as Slater Walker Securities (Hong Kong).

In April 1972, Haw Par Brothers International made a strategic investment on a property on 302 Orchard Road.

In 1973 the company expanded to Japan as well as bought 29% stake of a London-listed company London Tin Corporation. Haw Par Brothers International financed the deal by a proposed recapitalization. The stake was sold in 1976 and the sub-holding company that Haw Par Brothers International established in London, was sold in 1982.

Collapse of Slater Walker
The parent company Slater Walker was collapsed after the secondary banking crisis of 1973–75; the company was bailed out by the Bank of England. For Haw Par Brothers International itself, financial irregularities were exposed, for which former chairman Tarling was jailed for 6 months in 1979. Since 13 December 1978, the company has been chaired by Singaporean banker, Wee Cho Yaw. As of 30 March 2020, Wee, through his family investment vehicle, owns 36.23% of the company's shares.

Subsidiaries, brands and products
Kwan Loong originated from a different listed company of the same name (Kwan Loong & Co.), which was acquired in March 1972. It produces medicated oil, specifically , literally "oil that expels headaches."

Gallery

Footnotes

References

External links
 

1969 establishments in Singapore
Conglomerate companies of Singapore
Companies formerly listed on the Hong Kong Stock Exchange
Companies listed on the Singapore Exchange
Health care companies of Singapore
Aw family
Family-owned companies of Singapore
Singaporean companies established in 1969